Deathstalker War is a science fiction novel by British author Simon R Green.

The fourth in a series of nine novels, Deathstalker War is part homage to - and part parody of - the classic space operas of the 1950s, and deals with the timeless themes of honour, love, courage and betrayal.
 
Set in a far-future fictional universe, Deathstalker War develops the plot and themes introduced in the previous books in the series.

References
 

1997 British novels
British science fiction novels
Novels by Simon R. Green